Imants Bodnieks (born 20 May 1941) is a retired Latvian track cyclist. He competed at the 1960 Olympics in the 1000 m sprint and at the 1964 and 1968 Olympics in the tandem and won a silver medal in the tandem in 1964 together with Viktor Logunov. His father Džems Bodnieks was a prominent Latvian artist.

References

External links

 
 
 

1941 births
Living people
Latvian male cyclists
Olympic silver medalists for the Soviet Union
Cyclists at the 1960 Summer Olympics
Cyclists at the 1964 Summer Olympics
Cyclists at the 1968 Summer Olympics
Olympic cyclists of the Soviet Union
Latvian track cyclists
Olympic medalists in cycling
Soviet male cyclists
Medalists at the 1964 Summer Olympics
Sportspeople from Riga
Honoured Masters of Sport of the USSR